Pyranthus or Pyranthos was a small town in ancient Crete, near Gortyna. 

Its site is located near modern Trokhales, Pyrathi.

References

Populated places in ancient Crete
Former populated places in Greece